Blackburn Methodist Church is an historic church at D Street and 4th Avenue in Blackburn, Oklahoma.

It was built in 1904 and is classified as being a Territorial-era Carpenter Gothic church of North Central Oklahoma.

References

Methodist churches in Oklahoma
Churches on the National Register of Historic Places in Oklahoma
Carpenter Gothic church buildings in Oklahoma
Churches completed in 1904
Buildings and structures in Pawnee County, Oklahoma
National Register of Historic Places in Pawnee County, Oklahoma